What You Keep Close is the second studio EP by Canadian band Riverbeds, which was recorded in 2014. The album title was announced in December with a release date of February 5th 2015 for both physical and digital copies. It was self produced, with mixing handled by Ben Cardilli at Road Test Studio with assistance by Kevin Brunelle.

Track listing
"Forth" – 4:41
"Doubling Down On Diamonds" – 4:03
"Homa Lone" – 6:03
"Between Yellow And Blue" – 4:53
"Numbers" – 3:03
"Always More" – 6:11

Personnel

Riverbeds
 Alexandre Duhamel Gingras – bass, backing vocals
 Charles-André Chamard – drums, vocals 
 Fred Béland – guitar, backing vocals
 Vincent Pigeon – vocals, guitar, keyboard

Other
 Denis Falardeau - trumpet 
 Ben Cardilli - mixing 
 Kevin Brunelle - mixing
 Connor Seidel - drum engineer
 Liz Labelle - Additional lyrics on Between Yellow And Blue 
 Marie-Ève Archambault - album design
 Emily Desjardins - art installation and picture of front cover

References

External links

2015 EPs